Muhammad Jaber Āl Safa (also spelled Jabir Al Safa) (1875–1945) was a historian, writer and politician from Jabal Amel (in modern-day Lebanon), known for his founding role in the anti-colonialist Arab nationalist movement in turn-of-the-century Levant.

Biography
Jaber Āl Safa was born in Nabatiye into an illustrious family of scholars descended from the Safavids. His ancestor, Ismail Mirza, a son of Hamza Mirza - the eldest son and designated heir of Shah Mohammad Khodabanda - had traveled from Isfahan to Nabatiye to escape persecution by his uncle Shah Abbas I. 

Jaber Āl Safa studied language and history under renowned scholars Hassan Yusuf al-Makki and Muhammad Ibrahim al-Husseini. Jaber Al Safa and his companions Sheikh Ahmad Reda (also his father-in-law) and Sheikh Sulaiman Daher, having formed an intellectual gathering known as "the Ameli Three", also known as the "Amili Trio" or "Nabatieh Trio", played a principal role in forming Jabal Amel's political and cultural history, and were also the first in that region to speak of an Arab nation and of an Arab state.

Because of the group's strong opposition to the Ottoman rule, they were arrested in 1915, along with other Arab nationalist leaders such as Rida Al Solh and his son Riad, and imprisoned in Aley's military prison. They were liberated as the Ottomans left the country during the First World War.

He was a major supporter of King Faisal's rule in Greater Syria, following the Arab Revolt, having been a leading nationalist since before the outbreak of the First World War. Nationalists, prior to the revolt, were not secessionist. Rather, they called for decentralization and discussed nationalist ideas, while still positioning themselves within the Ottoman entity. Jaber Al Safa credited the Ottoman state with losing people's support because of the harsh measures it implemented regarding conscription and, before that, its suppression of Arabic as an official and administrative language and related Turkification policies brought forth by the Committee of Union and Progress.

Jaber, as part of the "Amili Trio", lobbied for Lebanon's union with Syria and opposed the French Mandate in Lebanon (he was briefly arrested by the French authorities but was released following widespread protests in Nabatiye in his support), remaining a supporter of pan-Arab unity until his death in 1945.

He wrote "Tārīkh Jabal `Amil", or "The History of Jabal `Amil", which is used as a main reference on the history of the Levant and Lebanon, and Jabal Amel in particular.

Ancestry

1st Imam Ali ibn Abu Talib, 601–661
3nd Imam Husayn ibn Ali, 626–680
4rd Imam Ali ibn Husayn Zayn al-Abidin, 659–713
5th Imam Muhammad al-Baqir, 677–733
6th Imam Jafar al-Sadiq, ca. 702–765
7th Imam Musa ibn Jafar, ca. 745-ca. 799
Abul-Qasim Hamza ibn Musa
Qasim ibn Hamza
Ahmad ibn Qasim
Muhammad ibn Ahmad 
Ismail ibn Muhammad
Muhammad ibn Ismail
Jaafar ibn Muhammad
Ibrahim ibn Jaafar
Muhammad ibn Ibrahim
Hasan ibn Muhammad
Muhammad ibn Hasan
Sharaf-Shah ibn Muhammad
Muhammad ibn Sharaf-Shah
Firuz-Shah Zarrin-Kolah
Awadh ibn Firuz-Shah
Muhammad al-Hafiz ibn Awadh 
Salih ibn Muhammad al-Hafiz
Qutb al-Din ibn Salih
Sheikh Amin al-Din Jibril ibn Qutbuddin
Sheikh Safi al-Din Ishaq
Sheikh Sadr al-Din Musa
Sheikh Khoja Ala al-Din Ali
Sheikh Ibrahim Shah
Sheikh Junayd
Sheikh Haydar
Shah Ismail
Shah Tahmasp
Shah Mohammad Khodabanda
Hamza Mirza
Ismail Mirza
Hijazi ibn Ismail
Muhammad ibn Hijazi
Jaber ibn Muhammad
Muhammad ibn Jaber
Taleb ibn Muhammad
Muhammad ibn Taleb Jaber Al Safa

See also
List of historians

References

External links
 , in Arabic.

1875 births
1945 deaths
People from Nabatieh
20th-century Lebanese historians
20th-century writers from the Ottoman Empire